1991 World Ice Hockey Championships may refer to:
 1991 Men's Ice Hockey World Championships
 1991 World Junior Ice Hockey Championships